In quantum field theory, a quartic interaction is a type of self-interaction in a scalar field.  Other types of quartic interactions may be found under the topic of four-fermion interactions. A classical free scalar field  satisfies the Klein–Gordon equation. If a scalar field is denoted , a quartic interaction is represented by adding a potential energy term  to the Lagrangian density. The coupling constant  is dimensionless in 4-dimensional spacetime.

This article uses the  metric signature for Minkowski space.

The Lagrangian for a real scalar field 
The Lagrangian density for a real scalar field with a quartic interaction is

This Lagrangian has a global Z2 symmetry mapping .

The Lagrangian for a complex scalar field 

The Lagrangian for a complex scalar field can be motivated as follows. For two scalar fields  and  the Lagrangian has the form

which can be written more concisely introducing a complex scalar field  defined as

Expressed in terms of this complex scalar field, the above Lagrangian becomes

which is thus equivalent to the SO(2) model of real scalar fields , as can be seen by expanding the complex field  in real and imaginary parts.

With  real scalar fields, we can have a  model with a global SO(N) symmetry given by the Lagrangian

Expanding the complex field in real and imaginary parts shows that it is equivalent to the SO(2) model of real scalar fields.

In all of the models above, the coupling constant  must be positive, since otherwise the potential would be unbounded below, and there would be no stable vacuum. Also, the Feynman path integral discussed below would be ill-defined. In 4 dimensions,  theories have a Landau pole. This means that without a cut-off on the high-energy scale, renormalization would render the theory trivial.

The  model belongs to the Griffiths-Simon class, meaning that it can be represented also as the weak limit of an Ising model on a certain type of graph. The triviality of both the  model and the Ising model in  can be shown via a graphical representation known as the random current expansion.

Feynman integral quantization

The Feynman diagram expansion may be obtained also from the Feynman path integral formulation. The time ordered vacuum expectation values of polynomials in φ, known as the n-particle Green's functions, are constructed by integrating over all possible fields, normalized by the vacuum expectation value with no external fields,

All of these Green's functions may be obtained by expanding the exponential in J(x)φ(x) in the generating function

A Wick rotation may be applied to make time imaginary. Changing the signature to (++++) then gives a φ4 statistical mechanics integral over a 4-dimensional Euclidean space,

Normally, this is applied to the scattering of particles with fixed momenta, in which case, a Fourier transform is useful, giving instead

where  is the Dirac delta function.

The standard trick to evaluate this functional integral is to write it as a product of exponential factors, schematically,

The second two exponential factors can be expanded as power series, and the combinatorics of this expansion can be represented graphically. The integral with λ = 0 can be treated as a product of infinitely many elementary Gaussian integrals, and the result may be expressed as a sum of Feynman diagrams, calculated using the following Feynman rules:

 Each field  in the n-point Euclidean Green's function is represented by an external line (half-edge) in the graph, and associated with momentum p.
 Each vertex is represented by a factor -λ.
 At a given order λk, all diagrams with n external lines and k vertices are constructed such that the momenta flowing into each vertex is zero. Each internal line is represented by a factor 1/(q2 + m2), where q is the momentum flowing through that line.
 Any unconstrained momenta are integrated over all values.
 The result is divided by a symmetry factor, which is the number of ways the lines and vertices of the graph can be rearranged without changing its connectivity.
 Do not include graphs containing "vacuum bubbles", connected subgraphs with no external lines.

Renormalization

The integrals over unconstrained momenta, called "loop integrals", in the Feynman graphs typically diverge. This is normally handled by renormalization, which is a procedure of adding divergent counter-terms to the Lagrangian in such a way that the diagrams constructed from the original Lagrangian and counterterms are finite. A renormalization scale must be introduced in the process, and the coupling constant and mass become dependent upon it. It is this dependence that leads to the Landau pole mentioned earlier, and requires that the cutoff be kept finite. Alternatively, if the cutoff is allowed to go to infinity, the Landau pole can be avoided only if the renormalized coupling runs to zero, rendering the theory trivial.

Spontaneous symmetry breaking

An interesting feature can occur if m2 turns negative, but with λ still positive. In this case, the vacuum consists of two lowest-energy states, each of which spontaneously breaks the Z2 global symmetry of the original theory. This leads to the appearance of interesting collective states like domain walls. In the O(2) theory, the vacua would lie on a circle, and the choice of one would spontaneously break the O(2) symmetry. A continuous broken symmetry leads to a Goldstone boson. This type of spontaneous symmetry breaking is the essential component of the Higgs mechanism.

Spontaneous breaking of discrete symmetries
The simplest relativistic system in which we can see spontaneous symmetry breaking is one with a single scalar field  with Lagrangian

where  and

Minimizing the potential with respect to  leads to

We now expand the field around this minimum writing

and substituting in the lagrangian we get

where we notice that the scalar  has now a positive  mass term.

Thinking in terms of vacuum expectation values lets us  understand what happens to a symmetry when it is spontaneously broken.
The original Lagrangian was invariant under the  symmetry . Since

are both minima, there must be two different vacua:  with

Since the  symmetry takes , it must take  as well.
The two possible vacua for the theory are equivalent, but one has to be chosen.
Although it seems that in the new Lagrangian the  symmetry has disappeared, it is still there, but it now acts as

This is a general feature of spontaneously broken symmetries: the vacuum breaks them, but they are not actually broken in the Lagrangian, just hidden, and often realized only in a nonlinear way.

Exact solutions

There exists a set of exact classical solutions to the equation of motion of the theory written in the form

that can be written for the massless,  case as

with  a Jacobi elliptic function and   two integration constants, provided the following dispersion relation holds

The interesting point is that we started with a massless equation but the exact solution describes a wave with a dispersion relation proper to a massive solution.
When the mass term is not zero one gets

being now the dispersion relation

Finally, for the case of a symmetry breaking one has

being  and the following dispersion relation holds

These wave solutions are interesting as, notwithstanding we started with an equation with a wrong mass sign, the dispersion relation has the right one. Besides, Jacobi function  has no real zeros and so the field is never zero but moves around a given constant value that is initially chosen describing a spontaneous breaking of symmetry.

A proof of uniqueness can be provided if we note that the solution can be sought in the form  being . Then, the partial differential equation becomes an ordinary differential equation that is the one defining the Jacobi elliptic function with  satisfying the proper dispersion relation.

See also
Scalar field theory
Quantum triviality
Landau pole
Renormalization
Higgs mechanism
Goldstone boson
Coleman–Weinberg potential

References

Further reading

 't Hooft, G., "The Conceptual Basis of Quantum Field Theory" (online version).

Quantum field theory
Subatomic particles with spin 0